Melody of the Heath is a 1956 West German romance film directed by Ulrich Erfurth and starring Carsta Löck, Martin Benrath and Kurt Vespermann. It is part of the post-war tradition of heimatfilm, taking place on Lüneburg Heath. It was shot in eastmancolor.

Synopsis
A young woman schoolteacher replaces an older male in rural Germany.

Cast
 Carsta Löck as Luise Nettebohm
 Martin Benrath as Ulrich Haagen
 Kurt Vespermann as Brettschneider
 Ludwig Linkmann as Windewitt
 Heinz Engelmann as Dr. Martin Newiger
 Hans Leibelt as Moralt
 Antje Weisgerber as Hanne Brink
 Charlott Daudert as Klara
 Gustl Gstettenbaur as Sepp
 Richard Handwerk as Nissen
 Harald Martens as Jörg
 Franca Parisi as Manuela Moralt

References

Bibliography 
 Harald Höbusch. "Mountain of Destiny": Nanga Parbat and Its Path Into the German Imagination. Boydell & Brewer, 2016.

External links 
 

1956 films
1950s romance films
German romance films
West German films
1950s German-language films
Films directed by Ulrich Erfurth
1950s German films